South Patrick Shores is a census-designated place (CDP) in Brevard County, Florida, United States. The population was 5,875 at the 2010 census. It is part of the Palm Bay–Melbourne–Titusville Metropolitan Statistical Area.

Geography
South Patrick Shores is located at  (28.202390, -80.604025).

Surrounding areas
Atlantic Ocean 
Patrick Space Force Base 
Satellite Beach 
Banana River; Merritt Island; Tropic

Demographics

As of the census of 2000, there were 8,913 people, 3,563 households, and 2,668 families residing in the CDP. The racial makeup of the CDP was 90.44% White, 3.65% African American, 0.53% Native American, 2.09% Asian, 0.06% Pacific Islander, 0.93% from other races, and 2.31% from two or more races. Hispanic or Latino of any race were 4.97% of the population.

There were 3,563 households, out of which 31.7% had children under the age of 18 living with them, 63.9% were married couples living together, 7.8% had a female householder with no husband present, and 25.1% were non-families. 20.9% of all households were made up of individuals, and 11.1% had someone living alone who was 65 years of age or older.  The average household size was 2.50 and the average family size was 2.89.

In the CDP, the population was spread out, with 24.0% under the age of 18, 5.3% from 18 to 24, 29.0% from 25 to 44, 22.3% from 45 to 64, and 19.4% who were 65 years of age or older.  The median age was 40 years. For every 100 females, there were 97.8 males.  For every 100 females age 18 and over, there were 93.9 males.

The median income for a household in the CDP was $48,197, and the median income for a family was $53,231. Males had a median income of $36,358 versus $26,535 for females. The per capita income for the CDP was $22,904.  About 3.8% of families and 4.6% of the population were below the poverty line, including 7.7% of those under age 18 and 2.2% of those age 65 or over.

Infrastructure

Roads
Travelocity.com named route A1A as the "Best Driving Route" in Florida. This runs close to the ocean. A secondary major route, paralleling it, is South Patrick Drive, which is close to the Banana River.

The Florida Department of Transportation maintains 513 and A1A.

See State Roads in Florida for explanation of numbering system.

  SR A1A - Miramar Avenue
  S 513 - South Patrick Drive

References

Census-designated places in Brevard County, Florida
Census-designated places in Florida
Populated coastal places in Florida on the Atlantic Ocean
Beaches of Brevard County, Florida
Beaches of Florida